Giuliano Bonfante (6 August 1904, Milan – 9 September 2005, Rome) was an Italian linguist and expert on the language of the Etruscans and other Italic peoples. He was professor of linguistics at the University of Genoa and then at the University of Turin.

Bonfante was born in Milan, the son of jurist Pietro Bonfante. He collaborated with his daughter, Larissa Bonfante, in his study of the Etruscan language. He became a member of the Accademia dei Lincei in 1958.

He died in Rome.

Bibliography 
 Della intonazione sillabica indoeuropea (1930)
I dialetti indoeuropei (Naples, 1931)
 Storia del diritto romano 2 v. (1958–59)
Latini e Germani in Italia(Brescia, 1965)
La dottrina neolinguistica (Turin, 1970)
Studi romeni (Rome, 1973)
La protopatria degli Slavi (Wrocław, 1984)
Grammatica latina: per le Scuole Medie Superiori(Milan, 1987)
 Lingua e cultura degli Etruschi (1985)
 La lingua parlata in Orazio (1994)
 The origin of the Romance Languages: Stages in the Development of Latin (1999)
 The Etruscan language: an introduction (1983; rev. ed. 2002)

Necrology 
 http://titus.uni-frankfurt.de/curric/necrolog.htm
 http://www.ilmanifesto.it/Quotidiano-archivio/10-Settembre-2005/art84.html

References

1904 births
2005 deaths
Linguists of Etruscan
Italian centenarians
Men centenarians
Linguists from Italy
Writers from Milan
20th-century linguists
Academic staff of the University of Genoa
Academic staff of the University of Turin